Saudi Arabia is the fourth largest state in the Arab world, with a reported population of 35,013,414 as of 2018. 38.3% of inhabitants are immigrants. Saudi Arabia has experienced a population explosion in the last 40 years, and continues to grow at a rate of 1.62% per year.

Until the 1960s, most of the population was nomadic or seminomadic; due to rapid economic and urban growth, more than 95% of the population is now settled. 80% of Saudis live in ten major urban centers: Riyadh, Jeddah, Mecca, Medina, Hofuf, Ta'if, Buraydah, Khobar, Yanbu, Dhahran, and Dammam. Some cities and oases have densities of more than 1,000 people per square kilometer. Saudi Arabia's population is characterized by rapid growth, far more men than women, and a large cohort of youths.

Saudi Arabia hosts one of the pillars of Islam, which obliges all Muslims to make the Hajj, or pilgrimage to Mecca, at least once during their lifetime if they are able to do so. The cultural environment in Saudi Arabia is highly conservative; the country adheres to the interpretation of Islamic religious law (Sharia). Cultural presentations must conform to narrowly defined standards of ethics.

Most citizens of Saudi Arabia are ethnically Arabs, the majority of whom are tribal. However, more than 30% of Saudi Arabia's population are non-citizens According to a random survey, most non-citizens living in Saudi Arabia come from the Indian Subcontinent and Arab countries. Many Arabs from nearby countries are employed in the country, particularly Egyptians, as the Egyptian community developed from the 1950s onwards. There also are significant numbers of Asian expatriates, mostly from India, Pakistan, Bangladesh, Indonesia, Philippines, Syria and Yemen. In the 1970s and 1980s, there was also a significant community of South Korean migrant labourers, numbering in the hundreds of thousands, but due rapid economic growth and development in South Korea, most have since returned home; the South Korean government's statistics showed only 1,200 of their nationals living in Saudi Arabia (most of them being professionals and business personnels) . There are more than 100,000 Westerners in Saudi Arabia, most of whom live in private compounds in the major cities such as Riyadh, Jeddah, Yanbu and Dhahran. The government prohibits non-Muslims from entering the cities of Mecca and Medinah.

Population

As of 2020, the country had a reported population of 35,013,414.

Structure 
The following data have been retrieved from the CIA World Factbook as of 2020.

Population Age Distribution 
0–14 years: 24.84%

15–24 years: 15.38%

25–54 years: 50.2%

55–64 years: 5.95%

65 years and over: 3.63%

Sex Ratios 

at birth: 1.05 male(s)/female

0–14 years: 1.04 male(s)/female

15–24 years: 1.09 male(s)/female

25–54 years: 1.52 male(s)/female

55–64 years: 1.61 male(s)/female

65 years and over: 1.12 male(s)/female

According to the CIA World Factbook the population of Saudi Arabia has a large young population ages 0–19 years and an increasing middle-age population ages 20–35 years. With a growing population reaching adulthood, global economists and the Saudi government have become concerned that there are more Saudis seeking jobs than are available. The nation has also seen a rise in its older population as life expectancy has risen throughout the last 40 years.

Life Expectancy At Birth 

The following data has been retrieved from the CIA World Factbook as of 2018.

total population:

male: 74.2 years

female: 77.3 years

Density 
Population Density: 15.322 people per km2 of land (2017)

Vital statistics

Births and deaths

Population Estimates by Sex and Age Group (01.VII.2020): 

The following data have been retrieved from the CIA World Factbook as of 2020.

 Birth rate: 14.7 births/1,000 population 
 Death rate: 3.4 deaths/1,000 population
 Maternal mortality rate: 17 deaths/100,000 live births
 Infant mortality rate:
 male: 12.2 deaths/1,000 live births
 female: 10.4 deaths/1,000 live births
 Total fertility rate: 1.95 children born/woman

Saudi Arabia is ranked 111th in comparison to the world with a birth rate of 18.51 births per 1,000 people in 2019. The nation's death rate is ranked 220th worldwide with 3.3 deaths per 1,000 people. Although birth rates have decreased in the last two decades, rates of decline fail to match the significant decline in death rates. Because of this, Saudi Arabia has experienced a population explosion in the last 40 years, and continues to grow at a rate of 1.63% per year. Saudi Arabia's population growth continues to be 0.295% higher than population growth rates in the Middle East and North Africa. Infant mortality rates have declined dramatically in the past twenty years from 25.3 deaths per 1,000 live births in 1995 to 6.3 deaths in 2017, according to the World Bank. Saudi Arabia has a substantially lower infant mortality rate in comparison to the Middle East and North Africa region, which continues to face a high of 19.3 deaths for every 1,000 live births as of 2017. This significant reduction can be attributed to rising access to modern healthcare across the country, ranking 26th worldwide for healthcare system quality. The construction of new hospitals and primary healthcare centers across the Kingdom, as well as healthcare during pregnancy and increased use of vaccinations account for a decline in infant mortality and increased life expectancy.

UN estimates

The Population Department of the United Nations prepared the following estimates. Population estimates account for under numeration in population censuses.

Nationality and ethnicity

Nationality 
noun:
Saudi(s)
adjective:
Saudi or Saudi Arabian

Ethnicity 

The ethnic composition of Saudi citizens is 90% Arab and 10% Afro-Asian. However, 38.3% of inhabitants (about 13.3 million people) are non-citizens, most of them are migrant workers.

Urbanization
The following data has been retrieved from the CIA World Factbook

urban population: 83.8% of total population (2018)

rate of urbanization: 2.17% annual rate of change (2015-20 est.)

Historically, some of the population of Saudi Arabia followed a nomadic lifestyle, while most lived in villages and small towns ran by emirs. Following the discovery of oil in the 1930s, the Kingdom became far more settled as people moved to centers of high economic activity. Significant population growth can be seen in the rise of urbanization throughout Saudi Arabia, which has grown 2 percent in the past ten years. The largest Saudi cities have become flooded with new residents as more people move to urban cities to find better employment opportunities, and overcrowding has become a major issue across the nation.

Migration 
Migration is a significant part of Saudi Arabia's tradition and culture, as the nation's thriving oil economy attracts large numbers of foreign workers from an assortment of countries throughout Asia and the Arab world. Following economic diversification in response to the oil boom of the 1970s, the Saudi government encouraged skilled and semi-skilled workers to enter the Kingdom as the demand for infrastructure and development intensified. Saudi Arabia is among the top five immigrant destination countries around the world, currently hosting 5.3 million international migrants in its borders. In 2017, non-native residents accounted for 37% of the Kingdom's total population, more than twice that of the United States whose immigrants make up 15% of the nation's total population. The majority of Saudi Arabia's foreign born population are males between the ages of 25 and 45. These immigrants make up a larger percentage of the total population in this age group compared to native-born Saudis ages 25–45, according to the United Nations 2013 report. 26.3% of the total migrant population in Saudi Arabia are from India, followed by Pakistan (24.2%), Bangladesh (19.5%), Egypt (19.3%), and finally the Philippines (15.3%). Most immigrants of the Kingdom are skilled, unskilled, and service industry foreign workers. Although the living and working conditions immigrant workers are harsh in Saudi Arabia, economic opportunity tends to be much greater than in their homelands. There are around five million illegal immigrants in Saudi Arabia, most of which come from Africa and Asia. These immigrants are planned to be deported within the next few years. There are around 100,000 Westerners in Saudi Arabia, most of whom live in compounds or gated communities.

People from other immigration jurisdictions

Religion

The government does not conduct census on religion, but estimates put the percentage of the majority Sunnis at 85-90%. The rest are other forms of Islamic minorities. Other smaller communities reside in the south, with Ismaili Shia's constituting around half of the population of the province of Nejran, and a small percentage of the Holy Islamic cities of Mecca and Medina. There is also a Christian population of uncertain size. According to a poll by WIN-Gallup International, 5% of 502 Saudi Arabians surveyed stated they were "convinced atheists".

Languages
The official language of Saudi Arabia is Arabic. Saudi Sign Language is the principal language of the deaf community.  The large expatriate communities also speak their own languages, the most numerous of which are Urdu (4,000,000) which after Arabic is widely used especially among the South Asian community, which makes the largest community of expatriate, Indonesian (850,000), Filipino/Tagalog (700,000), Malayalam (447,000), Rohingya (400,000), and Egyptian Arabic (300,000).

References

External links
 International Religious Freedom Report 2010

 
Society of Saudi Arabia